Burstall is a small town in southwestern Saskatchewan, Canada. 

During summer, the local Lions Club organizes an activity known as Summer Slam. The main economies in the area are natural gas, wheat and cattle farming. The area was originally settled by Germans, mostly Lutherans from South Russia. Starting around 1978, the town committee began a calendar that has everyone's birthday, anniversary and passing noted for each day.

Burstall has three churches:
 St. Paul Lutheran Church
 St. Michael’s Catholic Church
 Hope Evangelical Missionary Church

Burstall has many community facilities such as:

 Burstall Golf Course - a nine-hole course with manicured fairways, grass greens, white sand traps, water hazard, and clubhouse built in 2016.

 Community Hall - with a capacity of 300, which houses the offices of the RM of Deer Forks and the Town of Burstall

 Hockey Arena

 Curling Club

Demographics 

See also 
 List of communities in Saskatchewan
 List of towns in Saskatchewan
 Henry Edward Burstall

References

Towns in Saskatchewan